Favartia nivea is a species of sea snail, a marine gastropod mollusc in the family Muricidae, the murex snails or rock snails.

Description
The length of the shell attains 11.4 mm.

Distribution
This marine species occurs in the Austral Archipel, French Polynesia.

References

External links
 Houart R. & Tröndlé J. (2008). Update of Muricidae (excluding Coralliophilinae) from French Polynesia with description of ten new species. Novapex. 9(2-3): 53-93

Muricidae
Gastropods described in 2008